The 2018 Spikers’ Turf Open Conference is the revival conference of the Spikers' Turf. After the 2016 season of the Spikers' Turf, its affiliate league, the Premier Volleyball League (PVL), assumed the tournaments of the Spikers' Turf under its men's division until the collegiate conference of year 2018. The tournament began on October 6, 2018 at the Blue Eagle Gym, Ateneo de Manila University campus, Quezon City, Philippines.

Participating teams

Preliminary round 

 Team standings

|}

Point system:
3 points = win match in 3 or 4 sets
2 points = win match in 5 sets
1 point  = lose match in 5 sets
0 point  = lose match in 3 or 4 sets

 Match results
All times are in Philippines Standard Time (UTC+08:00)

|}

Final round 
The number 1 seeded Sta. Elena-NU pulled out of the conference after advancing in the semi-finals to represent the Philippines in the 2018 ASEAN University Games in Myanmar. Cignal HD Spikers and Philippine Air Force Aguilas will play a one-game knockout match to determine the team that will face the PLDT Home Power Hitters in the finals. PLDT has twice-to-beat advantage in the finals.

Semifinals 
Rank 1 vs Rank 4

|}
Rank 2 vs Rank 3

|}

Finals 
Finals play-off

|}
Championships

|}

Awards

Final standings

Venue
 Blue Eagle Gym

Broadcast partner 
 Hyper TV

See also 
 2018 Premier Volleyball League Open Conference

References 

2018 in Philippine sport